Brian van Loo (born 2 April 1975) is a Dutch former professional footballer. He has played for FC Groningen and Heracles Almelo. In September 2013, Van Loo retired from professional football. He has since worked as the goalkeepers coach at his former club Heracles.

Honours
Heracles Almelo
 Eerste Divisie: 2004–05

References

1975 births
Living people
Dutch footballers
Heracles Almelo players
FC Groningen players
Sportspeople from Almelo
Eredivisie players
Association football goalkeepers
Heracles Almelo non-playing staff
FC Groningen non-playing staff
Footballers from Overijssel